Savangiidae is a family of ctenophores belonging to the order Platyctenida.

Genera:
 Savangia Dawydoff, 1950

References

Tentaculata